Musah Amevor (born 31 October 1996) is a Ghanaian professional footballer who plays as a defender for Ghanaian Premier League side Aduana Stars.

Career 
Yeboah joined Aduana Stars in October 2019 towards the start of the 2019–20 Ghana Premier League season. On 12 January 2020, he made his debut coming on in the 75th minute for Farouk Adams in a 2–1 victory over King Faisal Babes. He went on a made 6 league appearances before it was cancelled as a result of the COVID-19 pandemic in June 2020. In November 2020, was named on the squad roaster for the 2020–21 season as the league was set to restart in November 2020.

References

External links 

 
 

Living people
1996 births
Ghana Premier League players
Aduana Stars F.C. players
Association football defenders
Ghanaian footballers